Sony VAIO AR series was a range of high-end multimedia notebook computers from Sony introduced in June 2006 as the first laptop with integrated Blu-ray drive (top model, costing $3,499 at launch - double the base model). It replaced the AX Series. It featured a 17" 16:10 widescreen LCD screen, with choice of 1440x900 or 1920x1200 resolutions (full HD 1080p capable). It was replaced by the AW series.

Launch specs were Intel Core Duo T2300, T2400 or T2500 CPUs running at 1.66, 1.86 or 2 GHz, Nvidia GeForce Go 7400 64MB, 7600 128MB, or 7600GT 256MB, with 160GB or RAID0 100Gb hard drives and 1GB of RAM.

These computers have a 17-inch widescreen LCD display and weigh 8.8 pounds (4 kg); because of this, they are the largest of the Sony VAIO computers and are considered to be desktop replacement computers. Being somewhere between a notebook computer and a desktop computer, it has exceptional functionality, considering they have the specifications equivalent to that of a desktop computer. However, as a result of its large size, it has a battery life between 1.5 hours and three hours; this is considered low for a notebook computer but sufficient for a desktop replacement computer.

Included in some models is also a movie pack, which consists of four predesignated feature films saved on the harddrive.

CTO Specifications 
Processors: 
Intel Core 2 Duo Processor T7250 (2.0 GHz)
Intel Core 2 Duo Processor T8100 (2.1 GHz)
Intel Core 2 Duo Processor T8300 (2.4 GHz) 
Intel Core 2 Duo Processor T9300 (2.5 GHz)
Intel Core 2 Duo Processor T9500 (2.6 GHz)  
Operating Systems:
Microsoft Windows XP Professional
Microsoft Windows Vista Home Premium
Microsoft Windows Vista Business
Microsoft Windows Vista Ultimate
Memory:
2 GB DDR-SDRAM (DDR2-667, 1 GBx2)
3 GB DDR-SDRAM (DDR2-667, 2GBx1 + 1GBx1)
4 GB DDR-SDRAM (DDR2-667, 2 GBx2)
Hard Drives:
320 GB SATA Hard Disk Drive [5400rpm]
240 GB SATA Hard Disk Drive
400 GB SATA Hard Disk Drive
500 GB SATA Hard Disk Drive
600 GB SATA Hard Disk Drive 
640 GB SATA Hard Disk Drive [2x 320GB]
400 GB SATA Hard Disk Drive [7200rpm]
Optical Disk Drives:
DVD±R DL / DVD±RW / DVD-RAM Drive
Blu-ray Disc Read Only Drive
Blu-ray Disc Read and Write Drive
Displays
LCD 17" WXGA+ (XBRITE-HiColor) 1440x900 resolution with integrated video camera
LCD 17" WUXGA (XBRITE-HiColor) 1920x1200 resolution with integrated video camera
Graphics Cards
NVIDIA GeForce 8600M GT GPU with Total Available Graphics Memory of 1279MB (max.) if 2GB System Memory is selected.
NVIDIA GeForce 8600M GT GPU with Total Available Graphics Memory of 1791MB (max.) if 3GB or 4GB System Memory is selected.
Video RAM: 512MB Dedicated Video RAM
Networking
Wireless LAN: Intel PRO/Wireless 4965AGN Network Connection (802.11a/b/g/n) w/ Bluetooth Technology: Integrated Bluetooth Technology

In addition, a Sony VAIO AR has an optional ATI TV Wonder Digital Cable Tuner and an optional extended battery.

External links
VAIO AR main page

References 

AR